Romeo Records was an American jazz record label that started in 1926 as a subsidiary of Cameo Records. The discs were sold exclusively at S. H. Kress & Co. department stores and retailed for 25 cents each.

In 1931 Romeo was acquired by the American Record Corporation and continued through 1938 until the cessation of ARC's dime-store labels: (Perfect, Melotone, Banner, and Oriole).

From the beginning, Romeo discs had a maroon label. It was changed to a black label in 1931 and then became blue in 1935.

See also
 List of record labels

References

External links
 Romeo Records on the Internet Archive's Great 78 Project

American record labels
Record labels established in 1926
Record labels disestablished in 1938
S. H. Kress & Co.
Jazz record labels
Companies established in 1926